Daniel Baier (born 18 May 1984) is a former German professional footballer who played as a midfielder.

Career
Born in Cologne, Baier first played for the youth team of TSV 1860 Munich. He generally plays an offensive midfield role. He played in his first league match against 1. FC Köln on 13 September 2003. He has played in the Under-20 German national team, his debut coming on 7 October 2005 against Wales. Dieter Eilts has said about Daniel Baier: "Daniel is an individual talent. He plays a deadly passing game. If he continues in this way, he has a big future." On 31 January 2010, he left VfL Wolfsburg and returned to FC Augsburg.

On 20 September 2017, Baier was fined €20,000 and suspended for one Bundesliga game, as he made a masturbation gesture at RB Leipzig coach Ralph Hasenhüttl during the 1–0 victory against Leipzig the day before.

After 355 competitive appearances for FC Augsburg, Baier was released by the club on 23 July 2020.

Baier announced his retirement from professional football on 9 September 2020.

Personal life
His father Jürgen was also a footballer who played for Darmstadt 98. His brother Benjamin, who is also a midfielder, currently plays for Viktoria Aschaffenburg.

Career statistics

References

External links
 

1984 births
Living people
Association football midfielders
German footballers
TSV 1860 Munich players
TSV 1860 Munich II players
VfL Wolfsburg players
FC Augsburg players
Germany under-21 international footballers
Bundesliga players
2. Bundesliga players
Footballers from North Rhine-Westphalia
Regionalliga players